For the 2000–01 season, Carlisle United F.C. competed in Football League Division Three.

Season summary
After the previous season saw relegation to the Football Conference avoided on the last day for the second year in a row, manager Martin Wilkinson was sacked and replaced by Ian Atkins, who had almost steered Chester City to Football League survival at Carlisle's expense.

Any hope that Atkins would produce an immediate turn-around was quickly dashed when the first half of the campaign turned out even worse than those of either of the previous two seasons, with  only three matches won before the turn of the year, and Carlisle entering 2001 looking hopelessly adrift at the bottom of the table. The team's spirits picked up thereafter thanks to a run to the third round of the FA Cup, where they were eliminated by Premier League Arsenal, and Carlisle's league form greatly improved, allowing them to secure safety on the penultimate weekend of the season (largely thanks to relegation rivals Barnet and Torquay United ending up playing each other on the final day, making it mathematically impossible for both clubs to overtake Carlisle).

With Irish businessman John Courtenay making overtures about purchasing the club, Atkins left by mutual agreement at the season's end, partly to become director of football at newly-relegated Oxford United, and partly to make way for Courtenay's preferred manager, Roddy Collins.

Results & fixtures

English Third Division

English League Cup

FA Cup

Football League Trophy

References
 11v11

Carlisle United F.C. seasons